Steve Leben (born June 23, 1956) is an American attorney. He served as a judge on the Kansas Court of Appeals from 2007 to 2020.

Biography
Judge Leben was born on June 23, 1956 in Eureka, Kansas.  He graduated from the University of Kansas with a B.S. in journalism in 1978.   After a brief engagement as press secretary for a Kansas congressman, he returned to the University of Kansas and received his J.D. degree in 1982.

Legal career
Judge Leben practiced law in the Kansas City area before becoming a judge.  He practiced with the law firm Stinson, Mag & Fizzell for 6 years and then practiced on his own for five years.  After this, he became a District Judge.  He has served on various law associations and has written and edited numerous articles.  He has also taught law classes at both the University of Kansas and University of Missouri-Kansas City law schools and was the president of the American Judges Association for a time.

Kansas Court of Appeals 

On February 12, 2020, Leben announced he would be leaving the court on June 26, 2020, to return to academia.

References

External links
 Kansas Court of Appeals website

1956 births
Living people
Kansas Court of Appeals Judges
People from Eureka, Kansas
University of Kansas alumni
University of Kansas School of Law alumni
20th-century American lawyers
21st-century American judges